Turtle Lake lies in the west-central of Saskatchewan, Canada and is fairly long (about 21 km) while also narrow (about 5 km across). The closest town is Livelong, and the closest cities are North Battleford, and Lloydminster. The lake takes its name from a Cree legend about a giant denizen called Turtle Lake Monster in the lake, and locals sometimes still tell stories of a monster of some sort in its waters.

Turtle Lake's primary outlet is the Turtlelake River, which flows south into the North Saskatchewan River near the Michaud Islands, across the river from Delmas.

Turtle Lake has several species of fish, including Sturgeon, Northern Pike (Jackfish), Walleye, and Whitefish.

Fish Stocking 
The fish stocking program at Turtle Lake started in 1950, and has been ongoing with some regularity over the past 80 years.  Two species have been the focus of the stocking program in an effort to bolster their populations: walleye and lake whitefish.

Whitefish stocking started in 1927 and was discontinued in 1984.  During this period, tens of millions of whitefish fry (newly hatched) were stocked.  From 1932 – 1962, over 14 million walleye fry were stocked in the lake.  The fisheries survey of 1964-65 indicated poor stocking success, so the stocking program was terminated.  But due to high angler demand for walleye in the late 1960s, the walleye stocking program was re-introduced.  From 1969 – 2004, another 22 million walleye fry as well as 461,300 walleye fingerlings (about 5 cm long) were stocked.  Currently, Turtle Lake is stocked with approximately 500,000 walleye fry each spring.

Wildlife 
There are many species of land animals in the Turtle Lake area ranging from squirrels, rabbits, and skunks to deer, moose, and the occasional black bear. The Black Bear occasionally eats fish from that lake and many lakes near there.

Communities 
Turtle Lake is a heavily utilized recreational lake; with over 1,500 cabins, the lake is dotted with several lakeside communities of cabin owners, including (clockwise from the north-east) Turtle Lake Lodge, Indian Point, Golden Sands, Sunset View, Evergreen Acres, Turtle Lake South Bay, Kopp's Cove, Aspen Cove, Parkland Beach, Powm Beach, All Seasons Resort, Kivimaa-Moonlight Bay, and Horseshoe Bay. Most beaches have several permanent residents; few have cabins for rent. Prior to 2010, Turtle Lake Lodge had a store and rental cabins with some facilities, since converted to residential lots.  Prior to 2018, Moonlight Bay also had a small store with fuel sales available. Since those closures, South Bay is the only beach on the lake with store / gas / restaurant & lounge operations, open seasonally during summer.

Turtle Lake Lodge History 

John Matthews arrived in the area as a very young man from the US, and was among the first to settle on the east side of the lake.  Unfortunately, the land was too poor for farming since the area straddles the transition to Boreal forest and much of it is light and very rocky.  Matthews eventually settled in the early 1930s on the homestead quarter where the Hamlet of Turtle Lake Lodge now sits.  Since farming was not sufficient in this area, alternatives were required which would fit with the country there.  These included fishing, boat building, carpentry, logging and trapping.  Today, the Matthews family is the last of the original homesteaders in the area east of the lake.

The sand beach in the area became known as "Matthews Beach", just as others around the lake were first named for who ever lived there. John built boats for others and was involved in the construction of a 36' fishing boat kept in a boathouse at 'Boathouse Bay', later to be known as 'Sunset View Beach'.

Between fishing and boat building, along with a lumber mill, John quickly had people coming to his beach to fish and wanting to rent a boat.  This was the beginnings of what would later become Turtle Lake Lodge. In the late 1940s he began adding a few simple cabins to rent to visiting fishermen.

In 1957, Matthews' son, Ottmer took over the business and continued to develop the resort and began renting lots along the lakefront, 
now Matthews Crescent.  The DNR operated a campground next to them and had a cabin their for the operator.

In 1964, Ottmer sold the land and business to Al Corrigal, and it subsequently became known as "Al's Beach".  Mr. Corrigal operated the small store, a tiny building right on the waterfront, selling pop, candy bars, and ice cut out of the lake in winter and kept for the summer under ground.  He continued to rent boats and cabins and expanded the resort business to include lot sales.  The first survey of lots was completed in 1964, whereupon previous tenant cabin owners were given the opportunity to buy their properties.

In the mid-1970s, Corrigal sold and moved to an acreage near Sunset View Beach.  Maurice and Jeanette Blais took over the resort and renamed it "Turtle Lake Lodge".  They built a large new store and several new cabins.  In addition, they improved the gas equipment, expanded the store inventory, added the ice cream machine, rental bikes and pedal boats, and attracted clientele from all around the lake.  They also greatly expanded the Hamlet with many new lots being developed and sold in addition to the Lodge business.  The business grew dramatically during this period.  The Blais' sold out after the 1996 season.

Brian and Les Clark, along with Bob and Maureen Craig, took over the business prior to the 1997 season.  They ran the Turtle Lake Lodge store for 13 seasons.  Living there full-time, they served the community in the summer, along with winter guests who came to hunt, snowmobile, and ice fish.  They also continued to develop and sell cottage lots and the Hamlet continued to fill in with new residents.

During this period, the Nature Sanctuary was also created immediately south of the Hamlet, occupying a unique and diverse quarter section, reserved for hiking and exploring nature undisturbed by motorized vehicles. It greatly enhanced the Hamlet and ensured that development in the area was restricted to the current Hamlet boundaries.

With rising operating costs and shrinking retail margins, seasonal stores all over the Saskatchewan began to close. As elsewhere, the value the Turtle Lake Lodge as an active business had fallen while the value of the land it occupied had dramatically increased.  In 2006 the store and property was up for sale.  At the end of the 2009 summer season, when an offer was made on the property, they closed the store for the last time.   They decided to liquidate the business assets and moved the store to its present location on Turtle Crescent, where the Clarks converted it to their retirement home.

Some of the undeveloped land was retained, including the original Matthews homestead site, next to the sanctuary, for future development.  The first phase of lots available from the land previously occupied by the store and rental cabins are for sale as of 2012.

Currently the Hamlet, which retains its legal name as Turtle Lake Lodge, is converted to a residential lake community without commercial services.  The community has become quieter and less transient, and the public beach has been improved along with its accompanying parking lot.  More street lights, improved drainage, and playground additions are all part of the process and transition from a commercial to a strictly residential community.

Turtle Lake Lodge Welcome Sign 

The sign was first commissioned by Turtle Lake Lodge store owners, Maurice and Jeanette Blais and installed on the Turtle Lake Lodge property.  The sign was designed by Maurice Blais  and made by Marcel DeRoo of Unity, Saskatchewan.  When the Turtle Lake Lodge business closed, the sign was donated by owners, Brian and Les Clark to the Turtle Lake Lodge Hamlet.
Over the course of 30 years, the sign had deteriorated and had been re-stained several times, hiding some of the original art work.  Kevin and Fay Hope stripped it, repainted the art work, and gave it a fresh clear coat and UV protective coating.  Metal roofing and log siding, mostly left over from the Hope's cabin at Sunset View Beach, were donated to the project, while the rest of the material came from the Co-op in Turtleford.

Willy Thompson, of the Turtle Lake Lodge area, helped with the design, did all of the carpentry in his shop and helped set it up in its new location at the entrance of the community with his bobcat.  Kevin and Fay then painted the new structure dark brown so that it would enhance the original sign, which is truly a work of art and part of Turtle Lake's heritage.  Kevin and Willy collected and hauled rocks and assembled them around the base.  This sign is, and will remain, unique to Turtle Lake and the Turtle Lake Lodge community.

Gallery

See also 
List of lakes of Saskatchewan

References

External links 
http://www.midwestcountry.ca/details.asp?id=31
http://www.tlwi.ca/turtle_lake_nature_sanctuary.htm
http://cryptozoo-oscity.blogspot.ca/2009/08/turtle-lake-creature-monster-or-fish.html
http://www.turtlelakelots.com
http://scotchy1ca.deviantart.com/art/sunrise-on-turtle-lake-sask-282234008

Lakes of Saskatchewan
Mervin No. 499, Saskatchewan
Parkdale No. 498, Saskatchewan